Imaikkaa Nodigal is a 2018 Indian Tamil-language action thriller film written and directed by R. Ajay Gnanamuthu. It stars Nayanthara with Atharvaa, Vijay Sethupathi, Raashii Khanna and Anurag Kashyap both marking their debut in Tamil cinema in prominent roles. The music was composed by Hiphop Tamizha, cinematography by R. D. Rajasekhar, editing by Bhuvan Srinivasan, and produced by C. J. Jayakumar. The film is a situational story focalizing on how a serial killer is apprehended by an intelligent CBI officer. 

It was released on 30 August 2018 and received positive reviews from critics and became a commercial success at the box-office.

Plot
A serial killer disrupts peace in Bengaluru by kidnapping, where he goes by the name of the highly notorious serial killer Rudra, who was announced dead five years ago. After another such case, in which the CBI are involved, he declares himself as the deceased Rudra and announces that he is now back in action. Anjali Vikramadithyan IPS, who dealt with the earlier case of Rudra, is appointed to deal with him.

In Chennai, Anjali's brother Arjun Prabakar, who is a MBBS doctor is facing a rough time in his relationship with Krithika Rao, by accusing her of cheating, and eventually break up with him. To make it up to her, he and his two year distant friend, Vinoth, travel to Bengaluru to meet her, but Arjun horribly enters the deadly scene between Rudra and Anjali. The cat-and-mouse game becomes intense when Rudra brings Arjun into the game by kidnapping Krithika and demanding a ransom from her father. In an effort to save Krithika, Arjun follows Rudra's orders and gets framed as Rudra, making things much more complicated for him. Anjali is suspended and her family gets under house arrest, where Inspector Narayan takes over the case. 

After a series of clues, Arjun deduces that ACP Martin Roy is the new Rudra and is trying to kill Krithika. He fights with Martin, only to get injured. Martin reveals that he was not the actual Rudra and reveals that Rudra was Anjali. Feeling betrayed that he was suspended from the case, Martin went rogue where he murdered his wife, and staged three murders of high profile people similar to the ones that Rudra had done. 

When Arjun confronts Anjali over being Rudra, she reveals that her real motive was to avenge the death of her husband Vikramadithyan, as he, along with Anjali were caught in an accident, caused by four influential drug addicted youngsters who decided to cover up the incident by murdering them and Vikramadithyan was left to die unattended with Anjali. However, a pregnant Anjali survived the accident and gave birth to her daughter Shalini. To seek vengeance for Vikramadithyan's death, Anjali created a serial killer named Rudra and brutally finished those youngsters, where she kills the last one and declares him as Rudra and closed the case. 

The clueless brother then feels guilty not knowing the pain his older sister had suffered. Arjun and Anjali together trap Martin using Narayan and Arjun fights and distracts Martin long enough for Anjali and Narayan to arrive with their force and Narayan shoots Martin dead. Arjun and Krithika reconcile while Anjali and Shalini listen to the recording of her father's last words for her.

Cast

Nayanthara as CBI Officer Anjali Vikramadithyan IPS (Voiceover by Deepa Venkat)
Atharvaa as Dr. Arjun Prabakar, Anjali's brother
Vijay Sethupathi as Vikramadithyan (Vikram), Anjali's husband (in past)
Raashii Khanna as Krithika "Krithi" Rao, Arjun's girlfriend (Voiceover by Raveena Ravi)
Manasvi Kottachi a Shalini "Shalu" Vikramadithyan, Anjali's and Vikram's daughter
Anurag Kashyap as Ex-ACP Martin Roy (Rudra) (Voiceover by Magizh Thirumeni)
Ramesh Thilak as Vinoth
Devan as CBI Officer Narayan Gowda (Voiceover by Chetan)
Uday Mahesh as Mr. Gowda
Vinoth Kishan as Dr. Vineeth
Sai Krishna as Ram
Vivek Raju as Prathap
Abishek Raaja as Surya
Aarthi as CBI Officer
Ranesh as CBI Officer
Vetrivel Raja as Nagesh
Ashok Pandian as Arjun and Anjali's father
Kishore Rajkumar as Arjun's friend
Kumar Natarajan as Krithi's father
B. Suresha as Minister
Jeeva Ravi as a victim's father (uncredited)

Production

Development
In May 2016, Ajay Gnanamuthu, who had previously made the successful horror film Demonte Colony agreed to work on a new film starring Atharvaa in the lead role. Initially reported to be a "romantic-thriller", it was revealed that the film was initially supposed to be made as the director's debut was delayed due to unforeseen circumstances. Thereafter, Jayakumar of Cameo Films agreed to finance the venture and revealed that the shoot would begin during September 2016. For the technical crew, R. D. Rajasekhar was selected as the cameraman, Selvakumar as the art director, Pattukottai Prabhakar as the dialogue writer and Poorthi Pravin as the costume designer. Only Bhuvan Srinivasan was retained as the film editor, continuing his association with the director. Meanwhile, Hiphop Tamizha was selected to be the music composer, while the film was titled as Imaikka Nodigal during September 2016.

Casting
The team signed actress Nayanthara to play the main female lead role in this project, as Gnanamuthu was looking for a "strong female protagonist", and after hearing the script, the actress immediately agreed to be a part of the venture. She played the elder sister of Atharvaa. For a further role, the team were on the lookout for a "pan-Indian actor" considering Prabhu Deva, Gautham Vasudev Menon, and Anurag Kashyap for the character, and the latter was signed to do antagonist's role. The voice for Anurag was dubbed  by director Magizh Thirumeni. Raashi Khanna was also signed on to portray another character in the film, and its marking her latter debut in Tamil cinema, appearing as Atharvaa's love interest, and it had been confirmed that Vijay Sethupathi would be seen playing 15-minute cameo role as Nayanthara's husband. Actor Kottachi's daughter, Manasvi, was cast as Nayanthara's daughter.

Filming
Filming took place in Bengaluru. In December 2016, Imaikkaa Nodigal became the first film to be shot inside the tunnel stretch of the Namma Metro. Filming took place after metro services ceased at 10 PM. According to Jayakumar, "The script of the film demanded shooting in various places of Bengaluru. The crew has been shooting in the city for the last 25 days. In the metro tunnel stretch, and shot scenes for two nights." A cycle fight featuring Atharvaa.  Lee Hon Yiu, a Cycle stunt specialist from Hong Kong, was brought down to work on this cycle stunt choreographed by 'Stun' Siva. Lee Honiyu is working along with the films stunt choreographer Stun Siva. This bicycle stunt was shot in five days at Bengaluru. Filming ended on 17 December 2017.

Music

The musical score and songs featured in the film are composed by Hiphop Tamizha, and the lyrics are by Kabilan Vairamuthu, Mohanrajan, and Hiphop Tamizha. The album was released on 27 June 2018 alongside the film's trailer.

The first single from the film has been released 4 October 2017, titled as Kadhalikathey, sung by Hiphop Tamizha and Kaushik Krish. Another single Vilambara Idaivelai sung by Christopher Stanley, Sudharshan Ashok, Srinisha Jayaseelan, and Hiphop Tamizha was released on 5 March 2018.

Release
Imaikkaa Nodigal was released on 30 August 2018. The satellite rights were sold to Colors Tamil and the Telugu dubbed version titled Anjali CBI was released on 22 February 2019.

Critical reception
Imaikkaa Nodigal received positive reviews from critics and audience.

The Times of India and Hindustan Times rated the film 3.5/5 with Times of India stating "Apart from a few make-believe scenes, the director manages to keep the twists unpredictable and the thrill factor engaging till the end." and Hindustan Times Noting "Nayanthara has succeeded yet again by picking a character that we have never seen her portray. Anjali is not perfect at what she does but her agenda is to catch the killer, played by Anurag Kashyap."

Film critic Baradwaj Rangan described the film as "A generic, barely watchable serial-killer thriller that squanders a great premise."

Accolades

References

External links
 

Films set in India
2018 action thriller films
2018 psychological thriller films
2010s Tamil-language films
Indian action thriller films
Films scored by Hiphop Tamizha
Films shot in Bangalore
Films set in Bangalore
Tamil-language psychological thriller films